Sum rule may refer to:
Sum rule in differentiation
Sum rule in integration
Rule of sum, a counting principle in combinatorics
The sum rule in probability theory follows directly from the probability axioms
Sum rule in quantum mechanics
In physics, Shifman–Vainshtein–Zakharov sum rules or QCD sum rules
In Quantum Field Theory, a sum rule is a relation between a static quantity and an integral over a dynamical quantity.